Po Ya is a crater on Mercury.  Its name was adopted by the IAU in 1976, after a person who live in 8th century B.C.

Po Ya is northwest of the larger crater Sōtatsu and northeast of Tintoretto crater.

References

Impact craters on Mercury